Broadstone railway station was the Dublin terminus of the Midland Great Western Railway (MGWR), located in the Dublin suburb of Broadstone.  The site also contained the MGWR railway works and a steam locomotive motive power depot.  A Luas tram station opened at the front of the station in 2017.

It is currently the headquarters of Bus Éireann, housing most of their administration and one of their main garages. Nearby on the same property is a Dublin Bus Depot.

History

Etymology
The name derives from the Norse "Bradogue Steyn" or "Broad Stone", due to the Bradogue River crossing the road to Finglas at this location.  "Bradogue" itself means "Young Salmon".

Beginnings
In 1845, the Royal Canal was purchased by the Midland Great Western Railway Company (MGWR) with a view to using the land alongside the canal to construct a railway line to the west of Ireland. The line was constructed in stages and by 1848 reached Mullingar. Similarly, Broadstone station was worked in tandem with opening in 1847 and final completion 1850.  The MGWR developed locomotive and carriage works around the station.

Designed by John Skipton Mulvany, the structure was built between 1841 and 1850, and the colonnade was added in 1861. Broadstone Station is constructed of granite in a neo-Egyptian style. Regarding the architectural merits of the station, historian Maurice Craig described it as "the last building in Dublin to partake of the sublime... Its lonely grandeur is emphasised now by its disuse as a terminus, and the melancholy quarter of high-and-dry hotels close beside it. It stands on rising ground, and the traveller who sees it for the first time, so unexpected in its massive amplitude, feels a little as he might if he were to stumble unawares upon the monstrous silences of Karnak or Luxor".

During the construction of the permanent roof in the late 1840s it was damaged by a severe gale but complete disaster was averted by the earlier timber structure over which it was being built.  The  by  two span roof is said to have been basis of the design for the larger span at Liverpool Lime Street. With the construction of the colonnade in 1861, trains arrived to the east side platform and passengers exited through the colonnade.  Trains departed from the west side platform where there was a booking office and waiting rooms.  The four middle tracks were used to stable rolling stock in the interim.  The building at front of the station was used as the headquarters building for the MGWR and did not contain a passenger entrance.

With Galway projected to become the main port for transatlantic passenger traffic between Europe and North America, the MGWR successfully competed with its rival the Great Southern and Western Railway to reach it first in August 1851. A special fourth class was introduced by the MGWR for poor migrants from the west going to Britain for work. The line, which branched out to serve Sligo, Westport, Achill and Clifden, was also used to transport large numbers of cattle.

It was about this time that the majority of the houses in the area were constructed as dwellings for workers on the railway. Most of the houses were built by the Artisan's Dwelling Company, which built many similar estates in Dublin and elsewhere, and houses of this type are now frequently described as Artisan cottages, regardless of their origin.

In 1856, Broadstone Garage was the site of the murder of station clerk George Little. His body was discovered in his locked office on Friday 14 November 1856, when he didn't check in for work. The story of the murder and the subsequent trial are told in the novel, The Dublin Railway Murder, which was published in 2021.

Joseph Howley, a member of the Irish Volunteers in Galway, was shot dead by a special unit of the RIC known as the Igoe Gang at the station on 4 December 1920 during the Irish War of Independence.

Closure
The station was closed to public traffic on 18 January 1937 with MGWR services redirected to the more central Westland Row (Pearse). While the old MGWR main line was able to access the Dublin loop line to Amiens Street via the North Liffey line Newcomen Bridge junction, this was not available to heavier engines such as the Woolwich Moguls due to weight restrictions over the lifting bridge over the Royal Canal.  The alternative route via the Drumcondra link line would have required reversals to the Glasnevin and Drumcondra junctions so the connecting line was also remodeled at the same time to allow direct through running.

After closure to passengers, the complex was used as a steam depot for Dublin, and then fully closed in 1961.

This building was one of Dublin's six original rail termini, the others being Westland Row (now Pearse Station) Amiens Street (now Connolly Station), Kingsbridge (now Heuston Station), North Wall and Harcourt Street (now a bar and nightclub complex).

Location
Situated at the crest of Constitution Hill directly opposite King's Inns, the station served as the finishing point of the Midland and Great Western Railway.

Failed proposal re-use for heavy rail
In April 2007 Iarnród Éireann announced that Broadstone Station was to be reopened for rail passenger use by 2010. However, by this time, the Railway Procurement Agency had drawn up plans to use the alignment for a Luas extension.  This gave rise to a dispute between CIE/Irish Rail and the RPA over the use of the trackbed between Broadstone and Liffey Junction. On 5 February 2008 Noel Dempsey, the Minister for Transport, indicated his preference for the Luas project over the re-opening of Broadstone for heavy rail, asking CIÉ to seek permanent planning permission to build and use Docklands Station for the purposes CIÉ intended for Broadstone Station.

Luas

In June 2013, Luas Cross City - a construction project which extended the Luas Green Line North from St. Stephen's Green to Broombridge - commenced.  The line, which opened to passengers on 9 December 2017, traverses the city centre on street-running track and arrives at Broadstone.  It then enters into the Broadstone cutting where it continues on its own right of way.

Broadstone - DIT is a Luas stop on the line.  Its name refers to the fact that it was intended to be the closest stop to Dublin Institute of Technology Grangegorman campus.  However, the plans were changed at a late stage, adding Grangegorman stop, which is closer to the campus.  Construction of the stop involved excavating a large amount of earth from the land in front of the station, and building a road bridge over the tracks which busses can use to access the depot.

The Luas stop has two lateral platforms and is in front of the station building.  It was built several metres below the station in order to make it level with Constitution Hill; and a curved, white wall separates the southbound platform from the garden in front of the building.  Trams approach the stop from Dominick Street Upper and continues by passing under the new bridge and turning sharply to the right, where they traverse the edge of the bus depot and enter the cutting.

Gallery

See also 
 Rail transport in Ireland

References

Notes

Sources

External links

 Disagreement between Irish Rail and RPA over access to Broadstone
 Industrial Heritage Ireland - Broadstone Station
 LUAS Cross City Project Website

Luas Green Line stops in Dublin (city)
Railway termini in Dublin (city)
Disused railway stations in County Dublin
Railway stations opened in 1847
Railway stations closed in 1937
1847 establishments in Ireland
Railway stations in the Republic of Ireland opened in 1847
Railway stations opened in 2017
2017 establishments in Ireland
Railway stations in the Republic of Ireland opened in the 21st century